A by-election was held for the New South Wales Legislative Assembly electorate of Cumberland South Riding on 21 August 1856 because Elias Weekes resigned in August 1856 after winning his appeal against his defeat in Northumberland Boroughs.

Dates

Result

Elias Weekes resigned in August 1856 after winning his appeal against his defeat in Northumberland Boroughs.

See also
Electoral results for the district of Cumberland (South Riding)
List of New South Wales state by-elections

References

1856 elections in Australia
New South Wales state by-elections
1850s in New South Wales